San Jerónimo District is one of eight districts of the Cusco Province in Peru.
  It is home to the Universidad Andina del Cusco.  According to the 2007 census, there are 31,687 residents in the district.  A large part of the population communicates in Quechua.

Geography 
Other mountains are listed below:

See also 
 Ch'iqullu
 Pachatusan
 Waqutu

References